The Arrabal's Suriname toad  (Pipa arrabali) is a species of frog in the family Pipidae found in Brazil, Guyana, Suriname, Venezuela, and possibly Peru. Its natural habitats are subtropical or tropical moist lowland forests, freshwater marshes, intermittent freshwater marshes, ponds, and canals and ditches. It is threatened by habitat loss.

The embryo of P. arrabali lacks a jaw sheath and labial teeth, unlike most tadpoles.

References

Pipa (frog)
Amphibians of Guyana
Taxonomy articles created by Polbot
Amphibians described in 1976